Ulpiano Sergio Reyes (born April 12, 1967), better known as Mellow Man Ace, is a Cuban-American rapper known for bilingual delivery and novelty rhymes. He was born in Cuba and moved to Los Angeles with his family at the age of four.

Early life and career
An Afro-Cuban rapper born in Cuba, Mellow Man Ace focused on lovers rap with a blend of urban hip hop and occasional bilingual delivery, and a heady gift for novelty rhymes. Born Ulpiano Sergio Reyes in 1967, he left Cuba with his family at the age of four and resettled in Los Angeles. His family moved to South Gate, California at a very young age.  His debut album Escape from Havana was released on Capitol on August 29, 1989, and featured production from the Dust Brothers and Def Jef.  The single "Mentirosa" was released on March 9, 1990.  It was his only hit single, peaking at Number 14 on Billboard's Hot 100 Chart, with Ace rapping over a crafty hook from the Santana songs "No One to Depend On" and "Evil Ways." His use of these songs got him into some legal trouble, as he had not obtained permission to sample Santana's songs, nor were any royalty fees paid to Santana before recording and releasing the track.  Ace recorded one additional album, The Brother with Two Tongues, before virtually retiring from the music scene, but 2000 saw the release of the album From the Darkness into the Light.  Next came the album Vengo a Cobrar. It was released on June 8, 2004 on Dimelo Records.  In 2006, he collaborated with his brother Sen Dog of hip-hop group Cypress Hill, culminating in the album release Ghetto Therapy.  2010 saw the release of the album Restoring Order.  In 2018, he released the single, "South Gate."

He was the first Latino artist to have a hit bilingual single, and has been called "The Godfather of Latin Rap." He was also a founding member of the hip hop group Cypress Hill and member of the Latin Alliance project.  Ace has a son named Cazal Organism who produces most of his more recent music, along with one daughter by the name of Havana Reyes.

Discography
Studio albums
Escape from Havana (1989)
The Brother with Two Tongues (1992)
From the Darkness into the Light (2000)
Vengo a Cobrar (2004)
Restoring Order (2010)

Collaboration albums
Latin Alliance with Latin Alliance (1991)
Ghetto Therapy with Reyes Bros (2006)
La Familia Vol. 1 with Various Artists (2008)

Charting singles

Filmography
 Only the Strong (1993) — Student rapper
 Heroes of Latin Hip Hop (2002)

See also
 Afro-Latinos

References

External links
Mellow Man Ace Interview on Dubcnn
LatinRapper interview
Interview on iHEARTDilla

1967 births
Living people
People from South Gate, California
American people of Cuban descent
Rappers from California
Capitol Records artists
Cuban people of African descent
Five percenters
Hispanic and Latino American rappers
Cypress Hill members
21st-century American rappers